"3500" is a song by American rapper Travis Scott featuring fellow American rappers  Future and 2 Chainz, released on June 8, 2015 as the lead single from the former's debut studio album, Rodeo (2015). It was produced by Metro Boomin, Zaytoven, Mike Dean, Mano and Allen Ritter.

Background
On June 5, 2015, Scott announced the song's title and featured artists, while also posting the single's cover art on his Instagram account. The song premiered on June 7, at the Summer Jam 2015 festival and was released for digital download on iTunes, the following day.

Chart performance
"3500" debuted at number 82 on the US Billboard Hot 100 chart on the week of June 27, 2015, with 43,000 copies sold in its first week. On January 11, 2017, the song was certified gold by the Recording Industry Association of America (RIAA) for sales of over 500,000 digital copies in the United States.

Charts

Weekly charts

Certifications

References

2015 singles
2015 songs
Travis Scott songs
Future (rapper) songs
2 Chainz songs
Songs written by Mike Dean (record producer)
Grand Hustle Records singles
Epic Records singles
Songs written by 2 Chainz
Songs written by Future (rapper)
Songs written by Metro Boomin
Songs written by Travis Scott
Song recordings produced by Metro Boomin
Songs written by Allen Ritter
Songs written by Zaytoven
Song recordings produced by Zaytoven
Song recordings produced by Allen Ritter